Lalim (also Romanized as Lālīm) is a village in Kuhdasht-e Gharbi Rural District, in the Central District of Miandorud County, Mazandaran Province, Iran. At the 2006 census, its population was 1,396, in 360 families.

References 

Populated places in Miandorud County